Silja Kanerva (born 28 January 1985 in San Diego, United States) is a Finnish sailor who took part in the Elliott 6m competition at the 2012 Summer Olympics. She was in the crew led by Silja Lehtinen and accompanied by Mikaela Wulff who earned the bronze medal.

References

External links
 
 
 

1985 births
Living people
Finnish female sailors (sport)
Olympic sailors of Finland
Olympic bronze medalists for Finland
Olympic medalists in sailing
Sailors at the 2012 Summer Olympics – Elliott 6m
Medalists at the 2012 Summer Olympics
Sportspeople from San Diego